The 1908 Cornell Big Red football team represented Cornell University in the 1908 college football season.

Schedule

References

Cornell
Cornell Big Red football seasons
Cornell Big Red football